#LookAtMe is a 2022 Singaporean film directed by Ken Kwek. It was premiered at 2022 New York Asian Film Festival. The film was inspired by Amos Yee's 2015 vlogs that criticised Lee Kuan Yew and Christianity, and other real life events.

Synopsis
Sean and Ricky Mazuki are twins who lived with their mother, Nancy. Ricky is gay, while Sean has a girlfriend, Mia. Mia invites the twins to the evangelical megachurch she attends where the pastor, Josiah Long, gives a homophobic sermon. The brothers become enraged by the sermon and Sean creates a vlog casting Josiah in a bad light. The vlog goes viral, which earns Sean a defamation lawsuit, and a jail sentence for violating Singapore's laws on "hurting religious feelings" and "spreading fake news".

Cast 
 yao - Sean and Ricky Mazuki (twins)

 Pam Oei - Nancy

 Ching Shu Yi - Mia

 Adrian Pang - Josiah Long

 Janice Koh - Gabriella Long

Reception 
Martin Lukanov of Asian Movie Pulse akins the scenes of Josiah Long giving his sermon to "a real video by a real church leader". Anthony Kao of Cinema Escapist writes that the film's choice to switch between genres was effective: family drama to build sympathy for the Mazuki family with the audience and tragedy and prison exploitation illustrating how the family's lives are spinning out of control. Niina Doherty of Eastern Kicks writes that "Kwek's criticism of [the societal issues of Singapore or its legal system] is subtle and effective". Akash Deshpande of High on FIlms writes that although the film had a chance of making a larger statement, it became "a reactionary work, which dulls its overall impact".

At the 2022 New York Asian Film Festival, the film won a Special Jury Mention for Best Performer for its lead actor, yao. 

On 17 October 2022, the film was refused classification by Infocomm Media Development Authority, which effectively barred the film from being screened in Singapore for "its potential to cause enmity and social division". IMDA, Ministry of Culture, Community and Youth, and Ministry of Home Affairs also stated that the pastor in the film engages "in an act prohibited by his professed religious faiths"; that the depictions of the pastor in the film are "suggestive of a real pastor in Singapore", and the allegations may be "perceived to be offensive, defamatory and contrary to the Maintenance of Religious Harmony Act". The film was scheduled to be screen at 2022 Singapore International Film Festival. However with the ban, the festival decided to included the film in its line-up however with the film marked as unavailable for screening. The director, Ken Kwek and producers decided not to appeal IMDA's decision, as after assessing the authorities' decision, they concluded that the possibility of the appeal being be successful would be "exceedingly silm".

Notes

References 

2022 films
2022 LGBT-related films
Singaporean LGBT-related films
2020s English-language films
Singaporean drama films
LGBT-related drama films
Films about LGBT and Christianity
Films about social media
Films about con artists
Films about police misconduct
Films about lying